The Wine of the Moon is a 1982 fantasy role-playing game supplement published by Ragnarok Games for Ysgarth Rule System.

Contents
The Wine of the Moon is the first of three supplements in support of the Ysgarth Rule System containing explanations, expansions, and corrections of the first edition of YRS, plus four new magic classes, five priestly orders, and 32 new skills.

Reception
Jerry Epperson reviewed The Wine of the Moon in Space Gamer No. 71. Epperson commented that "Overall, The Wine of the Moon has a few faults, but its merits far outweigh its liabilities.  For owners of the YRS, this is a 'must buy': for those who don't own YRS, though, there probably isn't that much generic material to cull from it to offset the asking price.  However, if any of the supplement's material sounds interesting, you could do far worse than owning it and YRS both."

References

Fantasy role-playing game supplements
Role-playing game supplements introduced in 1982